Oxted School is a coeducational secondary school and sixth form located in the English town of Oxted, Surrey. It was opened in 1929 as the first mixed grammar school in Surrey and now has over 1900 pupils aged 11–18 (Years 7-13).

History
Oxted County School, as named until 1999 when it became known as Oxted School, was built in 1929 at the cost of £35,000. In its first term it had only 22 pupils but this increased to 120 after two years. It was originally designed to grow to 250 pupils. Now, as of 2019 it has well in excess of 1900 pupils.

The school was the first mixed grammar school in Surrey when it opened.  The sexes were strictly segregated and they had separate staircases, playgrounds and had to sit at separate sides of the classroom in lessons. As a punishment, girls would have to write lines; boys were caned by the headmaster.

In September 2013, following the departure of Mr Guy Nelson as headteacher, the chairman of the school's governing body announced new leadership arrangements for the school. Mrs Rhona Barnfield, currently Executive Head of the Howard Partnership, an Academy Chain in Surrey comprising Howard of Effingham School near Leatherhead and Thomas Knyvett College at Ashford, was appointed Executive Head of Oxted School. Mrs Nicola Euridge, also from the Howard Partnership, was appointed Head of School, and made responsible for running the school on a day-to-day basis. The Howard Partnership forms part of the Howard Partnership Education Trust, to which is also linked the Howard Partnership Trust.

In 2014, 68% of the school pupils attained 5 GCSEs grade A* to C including English and Maths; 78% of its students attained 5 GCSEs at grade C and above.

In September 2015 the school converted to academy status sponsored by the Howard Partnership.

ODD Youth Theatre
The school has a performing arts department and its own theatre company called The Odd Youth Theatre. It is run by David Morris, the head of Drama. Having previously been known as The Performing Arts Society, the new name Odd Youth Theatre (Oxted Dance and Drama) was adopted when the company took Dancing In The Dark, adapted from the novel by Joan Barfoot, to The Edinburgh Fringe Festival in 1992. The company returned to Edinburgh in 1999 with two productions, Find Me and Molly. Recent productions include Under Milk Wood,  Oliver, Into the Woods, Guys and Dolls, Sleeping Beauty and West Side Story. The 2012 school production was the acclaimed A Christmas Carol.The most recent play performed by Oxted School, in 2013, was Andrew Lloyd Webber and Tim Rice's Jesus Christ Superstar. The play was performed by the Oxted Students in November and was rated "Amazing" by the Surrey Mirror. At the last performance David Morris quoted "Amazing six standing ovations." 2014 the school play Oh What a lovely war, 2015 Hairspray, 2016 Starlight Express, 2017 Anything Goes and finally 2018 Sister Act.

Buildings
 The original building of 1929
 The 1951 extension of the original building
 The PE Block (1960s)
 The Art Block (1987)
 The Drama Studio (1991)
 The Science Block (1993)
 The Design and Technology Block (1997)
 The Meridian Building (1999/2000). This replaced the destroyed 1960s Humanities Block, see below.
 A few hut classrooms constructed over the years
 The Eden Building (Mathematics) completed in summer 2008.

The Fire in 1998
On 16 August 1998 former students of the school allegedly set fire to bins outside the Humanities Block, resulting in a fire that destroyed the entire building. This contained 22 classrooms, library, canteen, thousands of books and 125 computers.

The school reopened as usual in September with temporary hut classrooms. Some of these huts still remain and have been refurbished in 2017 and in 2018.

The replacement building is called The Meridian Building  as The Greenwich Meridian runs directly through it. It contains 23 classrooms, library and canteen. It was opened officially in April 2000 by the former headteacher, Roger Coles.

Notable former pupils
David Baboulene Ph.D., Author, academic and story consultant.
Clement Crisp, dance critic
Ian Pearce, professional footballer.
Alison Streeter, record-holding swimmer, International Swimming Hall of Fame.
Tommy Hill, winner of the 2011 British Superbike Championship season.
Stacie Powell, Olympic Diver in 2008 and 2012.
Laura Trott, Conservative MP for Sevenoaks
Omari Hutchinson*, Chelsea FC Player

References

External links
 Oxted School website

Secondary schools in Surrey
Academies in Surrey
Oxted